Purrawunda is a rural locality in the Toowoomba Region, Queensland, Australia.

Geography
Purrawunda is on the Darling Downs. Soils in the area feature dark, medium clays which are fertile and well drained. The majority of the land in Purrawunda is used for agricultural purposes.

Road infrastructure
The Toowoomba–Cecil Plains Road runs along the southern boundary.

History
The name Purrawunda means big fight in the local Jagera language.

Economy
JBS Australia, a subsidiary of JBS S.A. owns Beef City at Purrawunda.  The beef abattoir is co-located with a feedlot so that meat quality and animal welfare can be maintained.

Australia's largest birdseed manufacturer, Avigrain has a mill at Purrawunda and processes and stores grain at the old Purrawunda Grainco silos.

References

Toowoomba Region
Localities in Queensland